The Cambodia women's national volleyball team represents Cambodia in international women's volleyball competitions and friendly matches.

It won 3rd place at the Volleyball at the 1970 Asian Games event in Thailand.

In 2019, Cambodia further announced its first women's national beach volleyball team.

Current squad
The following is the roster in the 2023 Southeast Asian Games.
Head coach:

Asian Games

 Champions   Runners up   Third place   Fourth place

References

External links
 Cambodia Volleyball Federation

National women's volleyball teams
Volleyball
Volleyball in Cambodia